Erik Georgiyevich Pukhayev (Russian Эрик Георгиевич Пухаев; born 5 May 1957) was the Prime Minister of South Ossetia from 2017 to 2020.

He studied at South Ossetian Pedagogical Institute from 1977 to 1982 and became Maths and Physics teacher. In 2005 he was nominated as director of Statistical Institute. From 2014 to 2017 he served as Vice-Prime Minister.

He is married and has 3 children.

References

1957 births
Living people
Prime Ministers of South Ossetia